Integris Health (stylized INTEGRIS Health) is an American 501(c)3 not-for-profit organization which manages health care facilities in the state of Oklahoma. Through affiliates Integris Health Inc. operates 16 hospitals and has health providers in 49 Oklahoma towns and cities. The Integris facilities include hospitals, rehabilitation centers, physician clinics, pharmacies, mental health facilities, independent living centers, and home health agencies, located throughout Oklahoma.

History
Integris Health was created in 1983 in order to serve as the parent corporation and to provide management and administrative support to Integris Baptist Medical Center Inc. However, the network of hospitals that now comprises Integris Health, was born out of a series of Oklahoma healthcare providers merging over the span of three years from 1992 to 1995, with additional hospitals brought on board later.

Integris's roots can be traced back to 1910, when a six-bedroom home in Enid, Oklahoma was transformed into Bass Baptist Health Center- a hospital that would eventually fall under the Integris name. Nine years later, Baptist Regional Health Center opened to serve the needs of lead and zinc miners.

Modern-day Integris began in 1946 when Dr. Andrew Potter and Dr. T. B. Lackey, both of the Baptist General Convention of Oklahoma, first proposed opening a Baptist hospital in Oklahoma City. On the Easter Sunday of 1959 this proposition came to fruition when Baptist Memorial Hospital opened its 200-bed facility in Oklahoma City. Sometimes called the "Hospital on the hill," Baptist Memorial Hospital sat atop an elevated area of land with little around it. Later, in 1965, South Community Hospital opened after hosting a fund drive to raise the money necessary to build.

In 1972 Baptist Memorial Hospital was renamed Baptist Medical Center. Six years later, in 1978, ownership of Baptist Medical Center was transferred from the Baptist General Convention of Oklahoma to the Oklahoma Healthcare Corporation. Then, in 1992, South Community Hospital changed its name to Southwest Medical Center. Two years later the first of several mergers occurred, with Oklahoma Healthcare Corporation joining with Baptist Healthcare of Oklahoma to form Oklahoma Health System. The next year, in 1995, Southwest Medical Center merged with Oklahoma Health Systems and the new organization was renamed Integris Health.

Over the next few years Integris grew to encompass several regional hospitals. In 2001 Integris built their first hospital under the new name, adding Canadian Valley Hospital in Yukon, Oklahoma. In 2009 Integris created a partnership with ProCure Proton Therapy Center to create the Integris Cancer Institute of Oklahoma, a facility that is one of only 14 in the county to offer proton therapy. In 2011, Integris Health Edmond was opened and in 2013 Integris became the majority owner of Lakeside Women's Hospital, greatly increasing their women's services. Later in 2013, Integris became a preferred clinical affiliate of Access Medical Centers, offering patients an urgent care alternative to the emergency room.

In 2014 Integris launched an online video platform, integrishealth.tv, to provide a place for patients and family members to learn about their services and educate the community about health issues.

Integris Health has partnered with the National Basketball Association (NBA)'s Oklahoma City Thunder and serves as the Thunder's official health care provider. As part of the partnership, the hospital also sponsors the Thunder's practice facility, which is known as the INTEGRIS Health Thunder Development Center. Construction for the practice facility was completed prior to the Thunder's 2011–12 season.

Locations
 INTEGRIS Baptist Medical Center
 INTEGRIS Baptist Medical Center Portland Avenue (formerly Deaconess Hospital)
 INTEGRIS Miami Hospital (formerly Baptist Regional Health Center)
 INTEGRIS Bass Baptist Health Center
 INTEGRIS Cancer Institute
 INTEGRIS Canadian Valley Hospital
 INTEGRIS Grove Hospital
 INTEGRIS Health Edmond
 INTEGRIS Southwest Medical Center
 Lakeside Women's Hospital

Cancer Institute

INTEGRIS Cancer Institute, is one of the seven comprehensive cancer treatment centers in the United States, currently providing both conventional radiation therapy and proton therapy. ICI Proton Campus, including the ProCure Proton Therapy Center, at Oklahoma City, Oklahoma. ICIO offers the first Brainlab radiosurgery system to Oklahoma implementing with Varian Novalis Tx. ICIO serves more than 3.6 million people in the Southwest area, mainly Oklahoma, and residents from North Texas, Kansas, and Arkansas.

Oklahoma firsts
 First to install cochlear implants in both adults and children and first double cochlear implant.
 First heart transplant.
 First in vitro fertilization baby.

Community involvement
In January 1993 Integris opened a free, all volunteer healthcare clinic to provide healthcare to the un- and underinsured residents of Oklahoma. In 1995 Integris also created the Basic Education Empowerment Program (BEEP) to help at-risk youths turn their lives around. In July 2000 Integris  took the unusual step of opening a charter elementary school, by transforming the struggling Western Village Academy into the Stanley Hupfeld Academy.

References

External links
 Official website
 Integris Cancer Institute

Companies based in Oklahoma City
Hospitals in Oklahoma
1983 establishments in Oklahoma